John Butler DD (d. 1682) was a Canon of Windsor from 1669 - 1682.

Career

He was educated at Trinity College, Cambridge.

He was appointed:
Chaplain to Prince Rupert
Chaplain to King Charles II
Rector of Hartley Westpall

He was appointed to the twelfth stall in St George's Chapel, Windsor Castle in 1669, and held the stall until 1682.

Notes 

1682 deaths
Canons of Windsor
Alumni of Trinity College, Cambridge
Year of birth missing